Abnub is a city in Egypt. It is located on the east bank of the Nile, in the Asyut Governorate, several kilometres northwest of Asyut. As of the 2006 census, the population was 67,526. The city's name is derived from the Egyptian god of mummification, Anubis.

Notable people
Abnub is the birthplace of Pope Shenouda III of Alexandria, the Pope of the Coptic Orthodox Church from 1971 to 2012.

References

Populated places in Asyut Governorate